Maxime Cressy defeated Alexander Bublik in the final, 2–6, 6–3, 7–6(7–3) to win the men's singles tennis title at the 2022 Hall of Fame Open. It was his maiden ATP Tour title.

Kevin Anderson was the reigning champion, but retired from professional tennis in May 2022.

Seeds
The top four seeds received a bye into the second round.

Draw

Finals

Top half

Bottom half

Qualifying

Seeds

Qualifiers

Draw

First qualifier

Second qualifier

Third qualifier

Fourth qualifier

References

External links
Main draw
Qualifying draw

Hall of Fame Open - Singles
2022 Singles